Frances Myers may refer to:
 Fran Myers, American television soap opera writer and actress
 Frances Myers (artist), American printmaker

See also
 Francis Myers (disambiguation)